Nove Zaporizhzhia (literally, New Zaporizhzhia) is a village (a selo) in the Zaporizhzhia Raion (district) of Zaporizhzhia Oblast in southern Ukraine. Its population was 771 in the 2001 Ukrainian Census.

Administratively, it belongs to the Dolynske Rural Council, a local government area. It is located west of the Khortytskyi District of the city of Zaporizhzhia, the oblast's administrative center.

References

Populated places established in 1922

Zaporizhzhia Raion
Villages in Zaporizhzhia Raion